Ole Jensen (born 25 May 1968) is a Danish neuroscientist and professor of translational neuroscience at the School of Psychology, University of Birmingham. He is known for his research work on applying magnetoencephalography to study the functioning of human brain.

Early life and education 
Jensen received a Master of Science degree in electrical engineering from The Technical University of Denmark in 1993. He was the doctoral student of John E. Lisman and received a PhD degree in Neuroscience in 1998 at Brandeis University, US. In 2013, he was appointed professor at the Science Faculty of Radboud University, The Netherlands where he established a research program on magnetoencephalography (MEG) at the Donders Institute for Brain, Cognition and Behaviour. In 2016 he was appointed as professor in Translational Neuroscience at University of Birmingham, United Kingdom, where he now is co-director of the Centre for Human Brain Health. He is known for his work on neuronal oscillations using computational neuroscience and magnetoencephalography.

Research area 
Jensen's research mainly focuses on the neuronal oscillatory dynamics supporting cognition in animals and humans. In particular, his work has addressed the role of alpha oscillations (or waves) by demonstrating that these oscillations reflect a gating by inhibition mechanism in attention, language and memory tasks. Other parts of his work has focused on understanding the coupling between slower and faster oscillations and how this kind of neuronal dynamics organize neuronal coding.

Selected publications

References

See also 

Danish neuroscientists
Living people
1968 births
Technical University of Denmark alumni
Brandeis University alumni
Academic staff of Radboud University Nijmegen
Academics of the University of Birmingham